The Seattle Chinooks were a minor league baseball team based in Seattle, Washington. In 1903, the Seattle Chinooks became charter members of the Class A level Pacific National League, placing third in their only season of play. The franchise was placed in Seattle by the Pacific National League opposite the Seattle Siwashes of the Pacific Coast League. The Chinooks hosted minor league home games at YMCA Park.

History
In 1903, the Seattle Chinooks team were charter members of the eight–team Class A level Pacific National League. In the era, Class A was the highest level of minor league play. Beginning the season, the Pacific Northwest League had changed its name to become the Pacific National League. This was a result of the California League expanding north into Seattle and Portland and changing its name to become the Pacific Coast League. As a result, the Pacific Northwest League placed franchises in Los Angeles, Portland, Seattle and San Francisco to match the Pacific Coast League teams in those cities. The new Seattle Pacific Northwest League team was named the "Chinooks," the team playing in the city, with the Pacific Coast League's Seattle Siwashes.

On April 14, 1903, the Seattle Chinooks began Pacific National League play, with the other league teams. The Pacific National League began play with teams based in Seattle , Los Angeles (Los Angeles Nationals), Portland (Portland Green Gages) and San Francisco (San Francisco Pirates), cities which also had rival teams in the Pacific Coast League. The Butte Miners, Helena Senators, Spokane Indians and Tacoma Tigers completed the league membership. On July 1, 1903, the Portland Green Gages moved to become the Salt Lake City Elders. On August 15, 1903, Tacoma and Helena folded from the league, with San Francisco and Los Angeles folding on August 12, 1903.

With the Pacific National League ending the season with four teams, Seattle placed third in the final standings. The Chinooks had a record of 78–71, playing the season under manager Dan Dugdale. Seattle finished 8.0 games behind the first place Butte Miners in the final standings.

Seattle did not host a Pacific National League team when the league continued play in 1904. The 1904 Seattle Siwashes continued play in the Pacific Coast League.

The ballpark
The 1903 Seattle Chinooks hosted home minor league games at YMCA Park, also known as Athletic Park. Opened in 1895 at the corner of 14th and Jefferson, the ballpark closed after the 1903 season. Today, Championship Field soccer stadium of Seattle University occupies a large portion of the site of YMCA Park.

Year–by–year record

Notable alumni

Bob Brown (1903)
Dan Dugdale (1903, MGR)
Jerry Freeman (1903)
Pat Hannivan (1903)
Jack Hickey (1903)
Bill Hogg (1903)
Billy Hulen (1903)
Harry Maupin (1903)
Ike Rockenfield (1903)
Elmer Stricklett (1903)
George Treadway (1903)

See also
Seattle Chinooks players

References

External links
Baseball Reference

Defunct minor league baseball teams
Baseball teams established in 1903
Baseball teams disestablished in 1903
1903 establishments in Washington (state)
1903 disestablishments in Washington (state)
Defunct baseball teams in Washington (state)
Seattle